The 1938 New Mexico A&M Aggies football team was an American football team that represented New Mexico College of Agriculture and Mechanical Arts (now known as New Mexico State University) as a member of the Border Conference during the 1938 college football season.  In their tenth year under head coach Jerry Hines, the Aggies compiled a 7–2 record, was recognized as a conference co-champion, and outscored opponents by a total of 166 to 75. The team played its five home games at Quesenberry Field in Las Cruces, New Mexico.

Four of the Aggies' players were selected to the 1935 All-Border Conference football team: ends William Malcolm and Melvin Ritchey; quarterback Eddie Miller; and tackle Joe Yurcic.

Schedule

References

New Mexico AandM
New Mexico State Aggies football seasons
Border Conference football champion seasons
New Mexico AandM Aggies football